The Langrishe Baronetcy, of Knocktopher Abbey in the County of Kilkenny, is a title in the Baronetage of Ireland. It was created on 19 February 1777 for Sir Hercules Langrishe, who represented Knocktopher in the Irish House of Commons.

The family seat from 1679 to 1981 was Knocktopher Abbey, near Knocktopher, County Kilkenny.

Langrishe baronets, of Knocktopher Abbey (1777)
Sir Hercules Langrishe, 1st Baronet (1731–1811)
Sir Robert Langrishe, 2nd Baronet (1756–1835)
Sir Hercules Richard Langrishe, 3rd Baronet (1782–1862)
Sir James Langrishe, 4th Baronet (1823–1910)
Sir Hercules Robert Langrishe, 5th Baronet (1859–1943)
Sir Terence Hume Langrishe, 6th Baronet (1895–1973)
Sir Hercules Ralph Hume Langrishe, 7th Baronet (1927–1998)
Sir James Hercules Langrishe, 8th Baronet (born 1957)

The heir apparent is the present holder's son Richard James Hercules Langrishe (born 1988).

Notes

References
Kidd, Charles, Williamson, David (editors). Debrett's Peerage and Baronetage (1990 edition). New York: St Martin's Press, 1990, 

Baronetcies in the Baronetage of Ireland
1777 establishments in Ireland